Tutekohi Rangi (1871–1956) was a New Zealand Māori tohunga and faith healer. Of Māori descent, he identified with the Te Aitanga-a-Hauiti iwi. He was born in Mangatuna, East Coast, New Zealand in about 1871.

References

New Zealand Māori religious leaders
Faith healers
Te Aitanga-a-Hauiti people
Tohunga
1871 births
1956 deaths